Taoyuan–Zhongli metropolitan area is the metropolitan area located in northwestern Taiwan, which encompasses most of Taoyuan City as well as parts of neighbouring urban districts of New Taipei such as Yingge and Linkou, with a total population of 2,309,475 as of mid of 2019. The districts of Taoyuan and Zhongli are typical twin cities within the region which share approximate population sizes and similar function of urban centres, and have been respectively emerging to regional commercial centres on the periphery of the northern and southern parts of the municipality. Many industrial parks and tech company headquarters settle in this region.

Taoyuan City witnessed the fastest population growth of Taiwan in the past few decades, and since 2014 it has been promoted to a special municipality from county status. It has become the fourth largest metropolitan area in Taiwan. In some sources, Taoyuan–Zhongli metropolitan area is occasionally viewed as an extent of Taipei metropolitan area due to its proximity and being complementary to each other economically, especially the Taoyuan International Airport is a major hub airport which serves the entirety of northern Taiwan.

Definition
Taoyuan–Zhongli metropolitan area, as defined by the government, includes the following areas:

However, since 2010, the term is no longer in official usage.

References 

Metropolitan areas of Taiwan
Geography of Taoyuan City